The 1965–66 season was Port Vale's 54th season of football in the English Football League, and their first season (second overall) back in the Fourth Division following their relegation from the Third Division. For the first time in their Football League history they played three divisions below rivals Stoke City. Despite hope of a swift return to the third tier, the season instead proved a complete disaster, the club finishing nineteenth (87th of the 92 League clubs). The appointment of Stanley Matthews as general manager meant an adoption of a youth policy, which eventually saw four teenagers make their debut in one match, as well as the arrival of several Scottish youngsters.

Overview

Fourth Division
On 19 July 1965, Stanley Matthews was appointed general manager to help his friend Jackie Mudie as manager. Matthews announced his policy of 'attracting and nurturing young footballers' and stressed the need for 'patience'. Matthews did not receive and did not request a contract. Though a massive lift for the club at the time, this development transpired to be a negative one for all involved, as Roy Sproson later explained that 'the club had their priorities wrong and the first team suffered badly, whilst Stan trusted people, who took advantage of him'. Most of the summer signings were youngsters, which also suited the club's directors, who had overseen massive losses over the past two seasons. In came Brian Taylor (£3,000 from Shrewsbury Town); winger Roger Smith (Walsall); Scottish inside-forwards John Cummings and Tommy Morrison (Aberdeen); as well as sixteen-year-old Scottish trialist winger Alex Donald. Matthews also initiated a series of trials for 700 boys.

The season opened with a 1–0 win over Colchester United in front of 11,212 at Vale Park. Two narrow away defeats followed, in what would be a season long pattern of success at home and defeat away. Terry Miles replaced Terry Lowe in a 2–0 win over Stockport County on 4 September to become Vale's first ever playing substitute. John Nicholson's club record run of 208 consecutive appearances, which began on 2 September 1961, ended on 8 September. Nicholson was unhappy with this and was consequently sold to Doncaster Rovers for £5,000 – much to the distress of supporters. Attendances fell away to only 4,605 on 18 September, when Vale 'disgraced themselves' by only beating Lincoln City 3–0, who provided 'abysmal opposition'. Keeper Jimmy O'Neill was 'in vintage form', but twelve forwards were tried up front in the first ten games. On 2 October Jackie Mudie's 'extra craft' helped the Vale to thrash high-flying Chester 5–2, and two days later Vale beat Crewe Alexandra. However the club then played a friendly with SC Tasmania 1900 Berlin in Berlin (losing 2–0), and proceeded to lose their next six league games. The club then signed Jimmy Hill from Everton for £5,000, however Hill seemed to be a replica of Mudie, rather than an addition to the firepower.

As Vale slipped down the table, they were denied permission by the Ministry of Labour to sign USA international Willy Roy as he did not meet the two-year residential requirement. More trouble came when Bo'ness United reported the club to the Scottish Junior Football Association for an alleged breach of the rules in the transfer of Roddy Georgeson. On the pitch results continued to go against the Vale, as they found themselves in a re-election struggle by January. Vale then went on a club-record six consecutive away games without scoring a goal in a run lasting from 8 January to 9 March. In came left-back John Ritchie from Whitley Bay, though free agent Graham Barnett did not return to the club, despite protestations from supporters – the management stated that Barnett's wage demands were too great. For the clash with bottom-placed Bradford City on 12 January, Vale assembled the youngest ever Football League forward line: Alex Donald (17), Roddy Georgeson (17), Mick Cullerton (17), Paul Bannister (18), and Paul Ogden (19). Of the five forwards only Bannister had played competitively before. Bradford won 2–0. A 2–1 win over Rochdale was then followed by four straight defeats. Cummings and Morrison were judged not to have made the grade and so were released form their contracts, signing with Ayr United and Sligo Rovers respectively.

Stanley Matthews encouraged supporters not to raise their expectations, claiming that "we are rebuilding and miracles don't happen overnight". Starting with a 2–1 win over Darlington, Vale picked up seven points out of a possible eight. Their defence was bolstered by the signing of keeper Stuart Sharratt from Oswestry Town for £2,000. However, by April they were back into the re-election zone. On 12 April, Malcolm MacKenzie began the youngest ever first team player for the club when at 15 years 347 days old he was selected for the game against Newport County. To act a nursery club, Broxburn Athletic of Edinburgh was adopted to save having to bring youngsters to Burslem for trials. They finished the season in indifferent form, and received a final day thrashing 5–0 from Luton Town at Kenilworth Road.

They finished in nineteenth spot with 39 points, leaving them two points away from having to apply for re-election. They were ahead of Chesterfield on goal average, and two points ahead of Rochdale, Lincoln City, and Bradford City, and four points ahead of Wrexham. Their 48 goals scored was atrocious, and easily the weakest in the division, though the defence only conceded 59. The one saviour was John Rowland, whose 23 goals in all competitions was almost quadruple that of his nearest rival.

Finances
On the financial side, another big loss of £29,696 was announced despite another large donation from the Sportsmen's Association, the Development Fund and the social club. Wages had risen by 25% to £54,552, there was a £5,000 credit in player transfers, though an improved home crowd average saw gate receipts rise by 25% to £30,994. The management were determined to stick with the club's youth policy.

Six players were released, most significantly Tony Richards departed, who had never really recovered from a knee injury, he joined Nuneaton Borough. Also leaving were Mel Machin to Gillingham, Roger Smith to Walsall, whilst Selwyn Whalley retired with a foot injury. This left 23 professionals at the club.

Cup competitions
In the FA Cup, Hill 'masterminded the Vale attack' in a 'thrilling' 2–2 draw at Third Division Oxford United's Manor Ground. Vale won the replay 3–2 to meet Dartford of the Southern League in the Second Round. Vale won 1–0 despite the best efforts of what The Sentinel described as 'man-eating sharks' that left the "Valiants" nursing several injuries. In the Third Round they were defeated 2–1 by Second Division Cardiff City at Ninian Park despite a surprisingly resilient defensive display.

In the League Cup, Vale drew 2–2 at home to Reading before exiting the competition with a 1–0 defeat at Elm Park.

League table

Results
Port Vale's score comes first

Football League Fourth Division

Results by matchday

Matches

FA Cup

League Cup

Player statistics

Appearances

Top scorers

Transfers

Transfers in

Transfers out

References
Specific

General

Port Vale F.C. seasons
Port Vale